Defending champion Robin Ammerlaan defeated Michaël Jérémiasz in the final, 6–7(1–7), 6–3, 7–5 to win the men's singles wheelchair tennis title at the 2006 US Open.

Draw

Finals

References 
 Draw

Men's Wheelchair Singles
U.S. Open, 2006 Men's Singles